Hygroma may refer to:
 Cystic hygroma
 Subdural hygroma
 Hygroma (canine disease) – swelling on or near a dog's elbow